An Lão may refer to several places in Vietnam, including:

 An Lão District, Bình Định
 An Lão District, Haiphong
 An Lão, Bình Định, a township and capital of An Lão District
 An Lão, Haiphong, a township and capital of An Lão District